The Hegemon-King Bids His Lady Farewell, also known as Farewell My Concubine, is a traditional Chinese opera. It was initially performed by Yang Xiaolou and Shang Xiaoyun in 1918 in Beijing. Though usually associated with Peking opera, it is also performed in other genres such as Cantonese opera.

The opera tells the story of Xiang Yu, the self-styled "Hegemon-King of Western Chu" who battled for the unification of China with Liu Bang, the eventual founder of the Han dynasty. In the play, Xiang Yu is surrounded by Liu Bang's forces and on the verge of total defeat, so he calls forth his horse and begs it to run away for the sake of its own safety. The horse refuses, against his wishes. He then calls for the company of his wife Consort Yu. Realizing the dire situation that has befallen them, she begs to die alongside her master, but he strongly refuses this wish. Afterwards, as he is distracted, Yu commits suicide with Xiang Yu's sword.

The novel Farewell My Concubine by Lilian Lee and its film adaptation of the same name use the play as part of their stories.

References 

Peking operas
Plays set in the 3rd century BC